The IPD Urubu (Brazilian-Portuguese name for the Vulture) also known as the IPD/PAR PE 80367, was a two-seat sailplane of high-wing.

Design and development 
In July 1978, the Ministry of Aeronautics asked IPD to develop a biplace glider to replace the LET L-13 Blaník, which was reaching the end of its service life. The work was executed by PAR (Divisão de Aeronaves) of the IPD. Development was completed in a few months and the prototype ordered from Aerotec, having been completed in 1979.

Construction 
Monocoque construction, entirely made of metal, the new glider was baptized "Urubu", and underwent a series of tests that proved its efficiency in flight, being approved by the Civil Aviation Department. Biplace, in tandem-seat, had a bubble canopy, and a fixed auxiliary wheel, built into the fuselage.

Specifications

See also
 List of Brazilian gliders

Notes

References

1970s Brazilian civil aircraft
1970s Brazilian sailplanes
Abandoned civil aircraft projects
Aircraft first flown in 1979
Urubu
High-wing aircraft